The Mini Estadio Cerro del Espino is a multi-use stadium located in Majadahonda, Community of Madrid, Spain. It holds 3800 spectators.

It is currently used for football matches and is the home stadium of Atlético Madrid reserve teams and CF Rayo Majadahonda. 

The venue is part of the Ciudad Deportiva Atlético de Madrid.

In the 2018–19 season, Rayo played its first Segunda División campaign at Atlético's Wanda Metropolitano due to the insufficient facilities at the ground.

References

External links

Atlético Madrid official site
At. Madrid B profile on Futbolme 
Estadios de España

Football venues in the Community of Madrid
Atlético Madrid
Sports venues completed in 1995
Sport in Majadahonda